71 may refer to: 
 71 (number)
 one of the years 71 BC, AD 71, 1971, 2071
 '71 (film), 2014 British film set in Belfast in 1971
 71: Into the Fire, 2010 South Korean film

See also
 List of highways numbered